Guwanç Hangeldiýew (born August 9, 1987) is a Turkmen footballer (midfielder) playing currently for HTTU Aşgabat. He scored in the game against Chinese Taipei in 2012 AFC Challenge Cup qualification.

International career statistics

Goals for senior national team

References

Living people
1987 births
Turkmenistan footballers
Turkmenistan international footballers
Association football midfielders
Footballers at the 2010 Asian Games
Asian Games competitors for Turkmenistan
21st-century Turkmenistan people